The Nokia 222 is a Nokia-branded dual-band GSM candybar-type phone originally developed by Microsoft Mobile and now sold by HMD Global. The phone is available in black, white.

Specifications  
Nokia 222 has a 2.0 MP camera, speakerphone, multimedia playback, MMS messaging, Opera Mini web browser and e-mail client. It also has Facebook and Twitter apps, as well as the Microsoft's features services such as built in Bing Search and MSN Weather. The Skype GroupMe chat is the new function of this new phone. The phone is also able to download other apps and games using the pre-installed mobile apps store. Battery talk time is up to 20 hours. Stand by time is 29 days for the single-SIM and 21 days for the dual-SIM. Its dimensions are 116 x 50 x 12.9 mm, and the weight is 79g. It uses 2G network infrastructure, and is activated through mini-SIM. The phone allows up to 1000 contacts to be stored in its address book. Like all Series 30+ phones, it can only store one number per address book entry. Nokia 222 has the Micro-USB adapter and it can SLAM share with free games.

Nokia 222 was released to consumers in the third quarter of 2015 in the Middle East, Africa, Asia, and Europe

See also 
 Nokia 3-digit series
 Nokia 215
 Nokia 220

References

External links 
 Nokia 222 (Microsoft Mobile Oy)

222
Nokia 222
Mobile phones introduced in 2015
Mobile phones with user-replaceable battery